Matej Delač (born 20 August 1992) is a Croatian professional footballer who plays as a goalkeeper for Danish 1st Division club Horsens.

Club career

Inter Zaprešić
A product of Inter Zaprešić youth academy, Delač started to impress very early on and after only a few appearances for Croatia U-15 he attracted attention from bigger clubs across Europe. During summer 2008, Delač went on trial at Portuguese Primeira Liga club Benfica and came very close to joining them, but the two clubs couldn't agree terms so he stayed at Zaprešić.

He had his professional debut for NK Inter Zaprešić in the 2008–09 season on 22 February 2009 against NK Zagreb, becoming the youngest player ever to appear in the Croatian first division (at 16 years and 186 days of age). He impressed football pundits in his debut by miraculously saving a penalty from Davor Vugrinec in the 85th minute, contributing to Inter's 1–0 victory and becoming man of the match. Delač continued with good performances and finished the 2008-09 season with 15 appearances, as the club's first-choice goalkeeper.

Chelsea
On 11 September 2009, two days after Croatia's defeat at Wembley, Croatian news reports revealed that Delač had stayed in London for a medical examination and was on the verge of signing a pre-contract with Premier League club Chelsea. Reports claimed that Chelsea scouts had been following Delač's performances in the Croatian first division for months and that their Director of Football Frank Arnesen previously went to Zagreb to agree terms of the transfer.

It was announced at a press conference held by Inter on 17 September 2009 that Delač had indeed penned a five-year contract with Chelsea which will come into effect in the January 2011 transfer window. In the meantime, Delač will continue playing at Inter, his wages will be paid by Chelsea, and he is also expected to participate in training at Chelsea's training ground whenever his Prva HNL obligations allow.

Loan to Vitesse
On 24 August 2010, Delač joined Chelsea's feeder club Vitesse on loan for the 2010–11 campaign. However, after being deployed as a back-up to Eloy Room and appearing on the bench for the majority of the campaign, Delač returned to Chelsea without making a single appearance for the Dutch side.

Loan to Dynamo České Budějovice
On 13 September 2011, Dynamo České Budějovice chairman Karel Poborský confirmed that Delač would join the club on loan for the rest of the season. However, on 4 January 2012, Delač was recalled by Chelsea after just making one appearance in a 4–0 league defeat against Viktoria Plzeň.

Loan to Vitória de Guimarães
On 17 July 2012, Delač joined Portuguese side Vitória de Guimarães on a season-long loan along with Chelsea team-mate Milan Lalkovič. However, after six months with the club, Delač had failed to make a first-team league appearance and therefore returned to Chelsea in January 2013. However, he made one appearance in an early round of the Portuguese Cup, which Vitória eventually won, making him a Cup winner.

Return to Inter Zaprešić
On 10 January 2013, Delač returned to boyhood club Inter Zaprešić on loan for the remainder of the 2012–13 campaign. On 15 February 2013, Delač made his Inter Zaprešić return in their 1–0 home defeat against Zadar. Delač went onto feature thirteen more times for the Croatian side in their unsuccessful relegation fight before returning to Chelsea.

Loan to Vojvodina
In July 2013, Delač joined Serbian side Vojvodina on a season-long loan. On 25 July 2013, Delač made his Vojvodina debut 3–1 victory against Hungarian side Honvéd in a UEFA Europa League qualifying tie. On 11 August 2013, Delač made his league debut for the Serbian side in their 0–0 draw with Donji Srem. Having established himself as a first choice keeper, Delač played an instrumental role in helping Vojvodina reach play-off round of 2013–14 UEFA Europa League, where Vojvodina lost to Moldovan side Sheriff Tiraspol. At the same time he quickly became a crowd favorite. Midway through the first half of the season, Delač lost his place as a starting keeper. By the end of December, he decided to cut his stay in Novi Sad short, and return to Chelsea.

Loan to Sarajevo
Preceding his return from Vojvodina, Delač joined Bosnian Premier League side Sarajevo on loan for the remainder of the season. On 1 March 2014, he made his Sarajevo debut in a 1–0 defeat against Čelik Zenica. A couple of weeks later, Delač registered his first clean sheet in Sarajevo's 2–0 away victory over Mladost Velika Obarska. He returned to Chelsea at the end of the campaign after appearing seven times for the Bosnian side.

Loan to Arles-Avignon
On 1 September 2014, Delač joined Ligue 2 side Arles-Avignon on loan for the 2014–15 campaign. On 12 September 2014, Delač made his debut for Arles-Avignon in their 1–0 league victory over Tours. Delač fell out of favour whilst at the French side and went onto make ten more league appearances before terminating his loan spell in January 2015.

Return to Sarajevo
On 27 February 2015, Delač returned to Sarajevo for the remainder of the 2014–15 campaign. On 14 March 2015, he marked his Sarajevo return with a clean sheet in their 0–0 draw with Borac Banja Luka. Delač went onto register seven more clean sheets, helping Sarajevo win their first league title since 2006.

On 7 August 2015, Delač's loan spell with Sarajevo was extended for a further season. On 26 October 2015, he suffered a serious anterior cruciate ligament injury, during the international break, therefore excluding him out Sarajevo's plans for the season.

Loan to Excel Mouscron
On 22 July 2016, Delač joined Belgian side Excel Mouscron on a season-long loan. On 17 September 2016, Delač made his Excel Mouscron debut in a 3–1 victory over Westerlo. On 27 October 2016, Delač registered his first clean sheet for Excel Mouscron in their 0–0 away draw with Waasland-Beveren.

AC Horsens 
On 3 April 2018, it was announced that Delač would join Danish Superliga side Horsens in the summer of 2018 on a free transfer when his contract with Chelsea ended.

International career
After earning 8 caps for Croatia's U-17 and U-19 teams between 2007 and 2008, Delač was called up by Croatia manager Slaven Bilić on 30 August 2009 to join the squad as third-choice goalkeeper (behind Vedran Runje and Danijel Subašić) for their 2010 World Cup qualifiers against Belarus and England, breaking the record for the youngest Croatian player ever called up for international duty.

Career statistics

Honours
Vitória de Guimarães
Taça de Portugal: 2012–13

Sarajevo
Bosnian Premier League: 2014–15
Bosnian Cup: 2013–14

References

External links
 
 

1992 births
Living people
People from Gornji Vakuf
Croats of Bosnia and Herzegovina
Association football goalkeepers
Croatian footballers
Croatia youth international footballers
Croatia under-21 international footballers
NK Inter Zaprešić players
Chelsea F.C. players
SBV Vitesse players
SK Dynamo České Budějovice players
Vitória S.C. players
FK Vojvodina players
FK Sarajevo players
AC Arlésien players
Royal Excel Mouscron players
AC Horsens players
Croatian Football League players
Czech First League players
Liga Portugal 2 players
Serbian SuperLiga players
Premier League of Bosnia and Herzegovina players
Ligue 2 players
Belgian Pro League players
Danish Superliga players
Croatian expatriate footballers
Expatriate footballers in England
Croatian expatriate sportspeople in England
Expatriate footballers in the Netherlands
Croatian expatriate sportspeople in the Netherlands
Expatriate footballers in the Czech Republic
Croatian expatriate sportspeople in the Czech Republic
Expatriate footballers in Portugal
Croatian expatriate sportspeople in Portugal
Expatriate footballers in Serbia
Croatian expatriate sportspeople in Serbia
Expatriate footballers in Bosnia and Herzegovina
Croatian expatriate sportspeople in Bosnia and Herzegovina
Expatriate footballers in France
Croatian expatriate sportspeople in France
Expatriate footballers in Belgium
Croatian expatriate sportspeople in Belgium
Expatriate men's footballers in Denmark
Croatian expatriate sportspeople in Denmark